Ruth Hunkeler (born 18 January 1940) is a Swiss equestrian. She competed in two events at the 1992 Summer Olympics.

References

External links
 

1940 births
Living people
Swiss female equestrians
Swiss dressage riders
Olympic equestrians of Switzerland
Equestrians at the 1992 Summer Olympics
Place of birth missing (living people)